Chak 235 GB Partap Garah (Urdu چک نمبر 235 گ ب پرتاپ گڑھ ) is located next to Chak 236 GB Kilanwala in Tehsil Jaranwala district Faisalabad, Pakistan. Kot Daya Kishen railway station is nearby. There is one high school for girls and one high school for boys in the village. Nearby other village is Chak 234 GB.

This village is far from main Jaranwala-Nankana Road. (12 km)There is daily riksha service from Jaranwala to 235 GB.Union council office is also in the village. There are five mosque and one church. Almost every cast (Rajput, Arain, syed, Gujar, Menhaas, Dogar, kharal, malik, Lohar, Kumhaar, Faqeer, massali, Bhadoo, Machhki, oodh) live here.  Master Asghar Ali and Master Mehmood(late) original name Ghulam Hassan are two famous teacher personalities in the village. Peer syed Maqbool Hussain Shah (peer Botay shah) is also a land mark personality and darbar in the village.

See also
Government Islamia High School Jaranwala

References

Villages in Faisalabad District